Zuleykha is a 2005 Maldivian romantic drama film written and directed by Fathimath Nahula. Produced under Mapa, the film stars Yoosuf Shafeeu, Mariyam Nisha, Sheela Najeeb, Mohamed Manik and Mariyam Enash Sinan in pivotal roles.

Plotline
The story is mainly based on the unconditional love of a father (Yoosuf Shafeeu) towards his only daughter (Mariyam Enash Sinan).

Shahid (Yoosuf Shafeeu) a dedicated tailor working at a company owned by a rich businessman engages in a romantic relationship with the owner's daughter, Zuleykha (Mariyam Nisha) despite her father's detestation. Shahid was fired from his workplace and ultimately quits his relationship with Zuleykha considering the barriers between their social classes. On a visit to a nearby island, Shahid meets Ashiya (Sheela Najeeb) who instantly falls in love with Shahid. Contemplating that Ashiya can distract him from his memories with Zuleykha, Shahid marries Ashiya but his life takes a toll due to her insolent behavior. At the time of pregnancy, she tried to abort their child only be stopped when Shahid promised her they will relocate to Male' sooner.

Shahid fails to convince his father to allow them stay at his house in Male'. He return to the island, only to discover Ashiya having an extramarital affair with her ex-lover where Shahid exposed her truth to the whole island and divorced her. He moved to Male' with his daughter, Zuleykha (Mariyam Enash Sinan) and starts working at a hotel where the owner of the place allowed him to stay at his place being impressed with his dignity and honesty. Meanwhile, Shahid consults Dr. Suheil, (Ali Seezan) who is Zuleykha's husband for having frequent headaches and coughing up bloody phlegm where he was diagnosed with final stage of cancer.

Shahid decided to hide the fact for Zuleykha and try to spend most of his time with her. However on Zuleykha's birthday Shahid died after giving his daughter's custody to Zuleykha and Suheli and left a note for Zuleykha, in which he advice her to be kind to everyone and alway do good deeds.

Cast 
 Yoosuf Shafeeu as Shahid
 Ali Seezan as Dr. Suheil
 Mohamed Manik as Fazeel
 Mariyam Nisha as Zuleykha
 Sheela Najeeb as Ashiya
 Mariyam Enash Sinan as Zuleykha
 Ahmed Asim as Hamid
 Aminath Shareef (special appearance)

Soundtrack

Accolades

References

External links 
 

2005 films
Maldivian romantic drama films
Films directed by Fathimath Nahula